Spook Town is a 1944 American Western film written and directed by Elmer Clifton. The film stars Dave O'Brien, James Newill and Guy Wilkerson, with Mady Lawrence, Dick Curtis and Harry Harvey. The film was released on 3 June 1944, by Producers Releasing Corporation.

Plot
The Texas Rangers investigate a town that's being terrorized by ghosts.

Cast 
Dave O'Brien as Texas Ranger Tex
James Newill as Texas Ranger Jim
Guy Wilkerson as Texas Ranger Panhandle
Mady Lawrence as Lucy Warren
Dick Curtis as Sam Benson
Harry Harvey as Drywash Thompson
Ed Cassidy as Ranger Capt. Wyatt
Charles King as Trigger
Robert Barron as Kurt Fabian
Richard Alexander as Henchman

Soundtrack 
James Newill - "Sleepy Hollow" (Written by Dave O'Brien and James Newill)
James Newill - "El Lobo" (Written by Dave O'Brien and James Newill)

See also
The Texas Rangers series:
 The Rangers Take Over (1942)
 Bad Men of Thunder Gap (1943)
 West of Texas (1943)
 Border Buckaroos (1943)
 Fighting Valley (1943)
 Trail of Terror (1943)
 The Return of the Rangers (1943)
 Boss of Rawhide (1943)
 Outlaw Roundup (1944)
 Guns of the Law (1944)
 The Pinto Bandit (1944)
 Spook Town (1944)
 Brand of the Devil (1944)
 Gunsmoke Mesa (1944)
 Gangsters of the Frontier (1944)
 Dead or Alive (1944)
 The Whispering Skull (1944)
 Marked for Murder (1945)
 Enemy of the Law (1945)
 Three in the Saddle (1945)
 Frontier Fugitives (1945)
 Flaming Bullets (1945)

References

External links 

1944 films
1944 Western (genre) films
1940s English-language films
American black-and-white films
Films directed by Elmer Clifton
Producers Releasing Corporation films
American Western (genre) films
1940s American films